Marie Woo (born 1928) is a Chinese-American ceramicist and educator.

Career

Early years 
Woo was born in Seattle, Washington to Southern Chinese parents. She obtained her Bachelor's degree in fine art from the University of Washington in 1954, and in 1956, her Master's from Cranbrook Academy of Art. It was there that she became proficient in the clay medium, in part by studying under Maija Grotell, a Finnish ceramicist considered the "Mother of American Ceramics."

Research in Asia 
Following what she called a "transformative" graduate program, Woo spent part of the 1960s in Southeast Asia; this would mark the beginning of a lifetime commitment to the traditions of Asian ceramics. Her postgraduate tenure was spent primarily in and around Bizen, Japan. Here she studied ancient methods of working in clay, including the local tradition of unglazed pottery.

Woo's interests in folk pottery were reignited in 1995 after a visit to Beijing, China. According to Woo, she was alarmed by how rapidly modernization was eclipsing interest in traditional ceramic practices. After receiving a grant from the Rockefeller Foundation in 1998, Woo was given license to explore the endangered ceramic traditions of China. She spent this time exploring kiln sites in remote villages, amassing a collection of folk pieces based in the tradition of unfired clay.

Later career 
Woo's extensive research in China culminated in her 2013 exhibition, "Chinese Folk Pottery: Art of the Everyday." Hosted by the University of Michigan Museum of Art, the collection continued to be shown for six years after it left the museum in Ann Arbor.

In early 2020, Woo was awarded the Kresge Eminent Artist prize, an honor worth $50,000. In doing so, she was the first ceramicist to win since the award was established in 2008.

Themes 
Considered a "potter's potter," Woo's work is notable for its technical imperfection and its interplay between form and function. In deference to Woo's 2016 retrospective, Clay Odyssey, art critic Sarah Rose Sharp stated, "There is great intentionality in the way that Woo has slashed and broken her forms – even those resembling traditional vessels have scarred-over cuts along their exterior surfaces, strategic tears and gouges, or oddly pinched handles on the lids of pots.” Speaking on her work, Woo says, "There is a permanence of ideas and forms when clay is frozen by fire. But unfired clay forms, when exposed to the natural elements, become slowly transformed, reclaimed and absorbed back to the earth, a metaphor for life. Ideas and built forms are erased and no longer recognizable."

Two glazes the artist has worked with and refined throughout her career, her signature "Woo Yellow" and "Woo Blue," are replicated by ceramicists internationally.

Personal life 
Woo is married to architect Harvey Levine, who she met while at Cranbrook. Together they have a son, Ian, a corporate pilot, and a daughter, Leslie Raymond, who is the director of the Ann Arbor Film Festival.

Awards 
 Kresge Eminent Artist Award, 2020
Lifetime Artist Achievement Award, Michigan Ceramic Arts Association, 2019
Gold Medal Award, Detroit Scarab Club, 2017
Asian Cultural Council Research Grant, Asian Cultural Council, Rockefeller Fund, 1998
Syracuse National Ceramic Exhibition Purchase Award, 1956

Exhibitions 
 Marie Woo: Clay Quest, The Scarab Club, Detroit, MI, 2020
 Clay Odyssey: A Retrospective, Birmingham Bloomfield Art Center, Birmingham, MI, 2016
 Michigan Masters Invitational, Kresge Art Museum, Michigan State University, East Lansing, MI, 2009

Collections 
Detroit Institute of Arts, Detroit, MI
 Everson Museum of Art, Syracuse, NY
 Mills College Art Museum, Oakland, CA

References

External links 
 Margaret Carney interviews with ceramicists, 1993-2019
Wonder and Flow: Marie Woo, 2020 Kresge Eminent Artist
Clay Odyssey: A Retrospective @ Detroit Art Review

Living people
University of Washington alumni
Cranbrook Academy of Art alumni
American potters
Educators from Seattle
1928 births